John Lee Johnson (born July 8, 1944), frequently known by the stage names Jai Johanny Johanson and Jaimoe, is an American drummer and percussionist. He is best known as one of the founding members of the Allman Brothers Band.

Johanson played with a number of Muscle Shoals and Memphis soul acts in the early-mid 1960s, such as Otis Redding and Sam and Dave, as a session and touring drummer.  While recording and touring he would meet the various members of what would become the Allman Brothers Band.  One of the few bands at the time to employ two drummers, alongside Butch Trucks they drew on R&B, blues, jazz, country, and rock to create a unique variety of southern rock.  Upon the death of founding bassist Berry Oakley, Johanson brought in frequent collaborator Lamar Williams to replace him.  While on hiatus from the Allman Brothers Band in the late 1970s, he formed the band Sea Level around a core of former Allman Brother Band members including Williams and pianist/vocalist Chuck Leavell.  He briefly rejoined the Allman Brothers in 1979, but left again in 1980 due to back problems, and spent much of the 1980s playing in local Macon, Georgia-area bands.  He rejoined the Allman Brother Band in 1989, as the band transitioned from a southern rock sound to a more jam band feel, having added a third drummer/percussionist Marc Quiñones.  The band continued to perform until formally retiring in 2014.  Johanson has since fronted his own jazz outfit, Jaimoe's Jasssz Band, and appeared with former Allman Brothers Band members for one-off reunions and in a number of different side projects.

Along with the other members of the Allman Brother Band, Johanson was inducted into the Rock and Roll Hall of Fame in 1995.  As of 2022, he and guitarist Dickey Betts are the two surviving original members of the Allman Brothers Band.

Biography

Early years
Born John Lee Johnson in Ocean Springs, Mississippi on July 8, 1944, he came up in the R&B world and began drumming at an early age, often accompanied by friend Lamar Williams on bass. Johanson backed soul singers, including a membership in Otis Redding's touring band in 1966, and afterward touring with the acclaimed soul duo, Sam & Dave. After joining up with Duane Allman in February 1969, he quickly became the first recruit into Allman's new group, soon joined by bassist Berry Oakley, fellow drummer Butch Trucks, guitarist Dickey Betts and lastly Allman's younger brother, singer, organist and pianist Gregg Allman. The group, quickly named after the brothers Allman, began recording demos that April in Macon, Georgia, which became the group's home base.

According to The Wall Street Journal, Jaimoe's "passion for jazz helped form the nascent Allman Brothers Band's improvisational approach, which incorporated blues, country and Western swing into a unique musical approach that nodded toward the Grateful Dead's West Coast explorations but never became as loosey-goosey."

“Music is music, and there's no such things as jazz or rock ’n’ roll,” Jaimoe told the WSJ. “I wanted to be the world's greatest jazz drummer, and I thought rock or funk were too easy—then I got a chance and couldn't play what needed to be played. I had to learn, and music was everything to me.”

1970–1980
The band's mixture of blues, country, jazz, and rock, spearheaded by the dual lead guitars of Betts and Allman, and the double-drums of Trucks and Jaimoe, was unique at that time, and they rapidly became known as an act that "you had to see live." Their first two albums, their eponymous debut (November 1969) and Idlewild South (September 1970) brought positive critical reviews but only limited commercial success. Their third album, however, recorded live at one of their favorite concert halls, Bill Graham's Fillmore East in New York City in March 1971, made them one of the biggest rock acts in America. At Fillmore East became a RIAA certified gold album in late October 1971, finally bringing the group the chart success that had eluded them. The band quickly suffered tragedy, however. Duane Allman was killed in a motorcycle accident a few days later. Shaken by the loss of Allman, the group soldiered on and released Eat A Peach, which reached #4 in the Billboard charts in 1972, a hybrid studio and live album, with outtakes from the Fillmore East concerts and studio cuts both with and without their original leader.

After touring in late 1971 and early- to mid-1972 as a five piece band, the group added keyboardist Chuck Leavell to their lineup, and began recording their fifth album. After recording only a handful of tracks, however, Berry Oakley was also killed in a motorcycle accident mere blocks from where Duane Allman had been struck. Lamar Williams, a bass guitarist who was a friend of Johansen, became a member of the group in the wake of Oakley's death. The album that resulted, 1973's Brothers and Sisters, added more of a country feel to their trademark sound and gave the group their only hit single, "Ramblin' Man." Just prior to the release of the album, they co-headlined the largest one-day rock concert in American history, in 1973 Summer Jam at Watkins Glen, complementing the Grateful Dead, and The Band as a support act.

In 1975, the Allman Brothers Band released the tepid Win, Lose or Draw, which, while a chart success, signaled an end for the band. A growing distance between Gregg Allman, who had risen to a de facto bandleader (then based in Los Angeles) and the rest of the band (still based in Macon, Georgia) exacerbated tensions. Perhaps most telling, the double drums of Jaimoe and Trucks, a signature of the group's sound, turned up missing on two of the album's seven tracks, with the drumming provided by producer Johnny Sandlin and occasional session musician, road drummer Bill Stewart (not the jazz drummer of the same name). The next year, the group disbanded in a storm of drug abuse and acrimony involving Gregg Allman's testimony at the drug trial of former roadie, Scooter Herring. Betts and Allman focused on their own careers, while Johanson joined forces with Leavell and Williams in the band Sea Level. Johanson played with Sea Level on their first two albums, before rejoining the reformed Allman Brothers Band in 1979.

1980–2000
After being terminated from the band in late 1980 due to increasing back problems stemming from a 1974 automobile accident, and the group's financial woes, Jaimoe lived in near poverty in Macon (playing off and on with "SouthBound" – Coop Frazier, Mike Joseph, Edd Anderson, Jay Cranford, and Stan Daniell at a small honky-tonk in Forsyth, Georgia known as Willie Lee's Good Time Tavern).  Johanson and bassist Lamar Williams were asked to join longtime friend Wayne Sharp and his band, The SharpShooter Band, in California. In January 1983, Lamar died, and the band went on hiatus. Jaimoe would eventually go back to the Allman Brothers in 1989; reunited with the group and rejuvenated by the growing jam band scene that viewed the Allman Brothers Band as one of the pioneering influences in the newly named genre, Johanson helped lead the band back into national prominence. Though guitarist Warren Haynes, bassist Allen Woody, and pianist Johnny Neel (all having joined the Allmans with their second reformation in 1989) would all leave, as would Haynes' replacement, Jack Pearson, Jaimoe remained. However, he watched Dickey Betts' acrimonious departure in 2000, who was ultimately to be replaced by a returning Warren Haynes. Despite their difficulties, he continued with the band.

2000–present

2000 to 2014 saw renewed success for the band. Jaimoe, Butch Trucks and Gregg Allman were joined by percussionist Marc Quiñones in 1991, bassist Oteil Burbridge (1997), guitar and vocalist, Warren Haynes (1989–1997; then again starting in 2000), and slide guitarist Derek Trucks (in 1999). Every March, the band had taken up a residency at New York's Beacon Theatre for several weeks of shows, often featuring an extended percussion battle between Trucks, Jaimoe, and Quiñones. This practice came to a final halt, after 40 years of performances since the Cirque du Soleil was given a permanent contract year-round at the Beacon Theatre. To celebrate this final tradition, in 2009, the band dedicated that year's multiple concerts to the late Duane Allman, inviting special guests from many genres to participate with them, including Eric Clapton, Levon Helm, Trey Anastasio, and many others. The band retired in 2014.

Jaimoe presently leads a jazz-rock collective known as Jaimoe's Jasssz Band, which he started during breaks in Allman Brothers Band touring. The collective plays clubs in New York and his adopted home of Bloomfield, Connecticut. In 2015 he joined Les Brers, a band led by his longtime Allman Brothers drumming partner Butch Trucks.

In 2017, Jaimoe received the Lifetime Achievement Award in the Arts, from his native state of Mississippi.

In 1995, Jaimoe and the other founding members of the Allman Brothers Band were inducted into the Rock and Roll Hall of Fame.

Following the 2017 deaths of Butch Trucks and Gregg Allman, Jaimoe and Dickey Betts are the last surviving original members of the Allman Brothers Band.

On March 10, 2020, "The Brothers" reunited at a sold-out Madison Square Garden, featuring Jaimoe, Warren Haynes, Derek Trucks, Oteil Burbridge, and Marc Quiñones - the surviving members of the final Allman Brothers lineup, which played together from 2001-2014. They were joined by drummer Duane Trucks (Derek's brother), organist Reese Wynans, who played with the then-unnamed band in 1969 before Gregg Allman joined, and pianist Chuck Leavell.

"I wanted to play music with my brothers," Jaimoe told The Wall Street Journal, explaining why he jump-started the idea of celebrating the band's 50th anniversary. "Everyone else is paying homage to the Allman Brothers music—and some of us are still here."

Jai Johanny Johanson discography

The Allman Brothers Band

 The Allman Brothers Band (1969)
 Idlewild South (1970)
 At Fillmore East (1971) 
 Eat a Peach (1972) 
 Brothers and Sisters (1973)
 Win, Lose or Draw (1975)
 Wipe the Windows, Check the Oil, Dollar Gas (1976)
 Enlightened Rogues (1979)
 Reach for the Sky (1980)
 Seven Turns (1990)
 Shades of Two Worlds (1991)
 An Evening with the Allman Brothers Band: First Set (1992)
 Where It All Begins (1994)
 An Evening with the Allman Brothers Band: 2nd Set (1995)
 Peakin' at the Beacon (2000) 
 Hittin' the Note (2003)

Sea Level

 Sea Level (1977)
 Cats on the Coast (1977)

Jaimoe's Jasssz Band

 Ed Blackwell Memorial Concert 2/27/2008 (2008)
 Live at The Double Down Grill 1/28/2006 (2008)
 Renaissance Man (2011)

References

External links
 Butch Trucks, Jaimoe Jai Johanny Johanson, Marc Quiñones at drummerworld.com

1944 births
Living people
People from Ocean Springs, Mississippi
American rock drummers
African-American drummers
African-American rock musicians
Singers from Mississippi
The Allman Brothers Band members
Capricorn Records artists
20th-century American drummers
American male drummers
Sea Level (band) members
Blues rock musicians